Kenojuak Ashevak,  (Inuktitut: ᕿᓐᓄᐊᔪᐊᖅ ᐋᓯᕙᒃ, Qinnuajuaq Aasivak), (October 3, 1927 – January 8, 2013) is celebrated as a leading figure of modern Inuit art.

Early life and family
Kenojuak Ashevak was born in an igloo in an Inuit camp, Ikirasaq, at the southern coast of Baffin Island. Her father, Ushuakjuk, an Inuit hunter and fur trader, and her mother, Silaqqi, named Kenojuak after Silaqqi's deceased father. According to this Inuit naming tradition, the love and respect that had been accorded to her during her lifetime would now pass on to their daughter. Kenojuak also had a brother and a sister.

Kenojuak remembered Ushuakjuk as "a kind and benevolent man." According to Kenojuak, her father believed he could predict weather, predict good hunting seasons and even turn into a walrus; he also had the ability "to make fish swarm at the surface so it was easier to fish." Her father came into conflict with Christian converts, and some enemies assassinated him in a hunting camp in 1933, when she was only six.

After her father's murder, Kenojuak moved with her widowed mother Silaqqi and family to the home of Silaqqi's mother, Koweesa, who taught her traditional crafts, including the repair of sealskins for trade with the Hudson's Bay Company and how to make waterproof clothes sewn with caribou sinew.

When she was 19, her mother, Silaqqi, and stepfather, Takpaugni, arranged for her to marry Johnniebo Ashevak (1923–1972), a local Inuit hunter. Kenojuak was reluctant, she said, even playfully throwing pebbles at him when he would approach her. In time, however, she came to love him for his kindness and gentleness, a man who developed artistic talents in his own right and who sometimes collaborated with her on projects; the National Gallery of Canada holds two of Johnniebo's works, Taleelayo with Sea Bird (1965) and Hare Spirits (1960).

In 1950 a public health nurse arrived in her Arctic village; Kenojuak, having tested positive in a tuberculosis screening, was sent against her will to Parc Savard hospital in Quebec City, where she stayed for over three years, from early 1952 to the summer of 1955. She had just given birth when she was forcibly transferred; the baby was adopted by a neighbouring family. Several of Kenojuak's children died while she was confined in hospital.

In 1966, Kenojuak and Johnniebo moved to Cape Dorset. Many of their children and grandchildren succumbed to disease, as did her husband after 26 years of marriage. Three daughters of Kenojuak, Mary, Elisapee Qiqituk, and Aggeok, died in childhood, and four sons, Jamasie, her adopted son Ashevak, and Kadlarjuk and Qiqituk. The latter two were adopted at birth by another family.

The year after Johnniebo died in 1972, Kenojuak remarried, to Etyguyakjua Pee; he died in 1977. In 1978 she married Joanassie Igiu. She had 11 children by her first husband and adopted five more; seven of her children died in childhood. At the time of her death from lung cancer, she was living in a wood-frame house in Kinngait (Cape Dorset).

Career
Kenojuak Ashevak became one of the first Inuit women in Cape Dorset to begin drawing. She worked in graphite, coloured pencils and felt-tip pens, and occasionally used poster paints, watercolours or acrylics. She created many carvings from soapstone and thousands of drawings, etchings, stonecut prints and prints — all sought after by museums and collectors. She designed several drawings for Canadian stamps and coins, and in 2004 she created the first Inuit-designed stained-glass window for the John Bell Chapel in Oakville, Ontario. In 2017, the $10 bill released in celebration of Canada's 150th birthday features Kenojuak's stone-cut and stencil printed work called "Owl’s Bouquet" in silver holographic foil.

During Ashevak's stay at Parc Savard hospital in Quebec City, 1952 to 1955, she learned to make dolls from Harold Pfeiffer and to do beadwork. These crafts later attracted the attention of civil administrator and pioneer Inuit art promoter James Archibald Houston and his wife Alma. Houston introduced print-making to Cape Dorset artists in the 1950s, and he and his wife began marketing Inuit arts and crafts, including an exhibit of Inuit art in 1959. James Houston wrote about this time in 1999:She was hesitant at first, claiming that she could not draw and that drawing was a man’s business. Yet the next time that she visited the Houstons, the sheets of paper that Alma had given her were filled with pencil sketches.In 1958 her first print, Rabbit Eating Seaweed, was produced from one of her designs on a sealskin bag, and by 1959 Kenojuak and other Cape Dorset Inuit had formed the West Baffin Eskimo Co-operative as a senlavik (workshop) for aspiring Inuit artists, later known as Kinngait Studios. Fellow members included Pitaloosie Saila, Mayoreak Ashoona, and Napatchie Pootagook.

Her reception in southern Canada was rapidly favourable:
 
 Rabbit Eating Seaweed was Ashevak's first print, part of a debut exhibition of Inuit graphics. The young woman from the remote Canadian North was an immediate success, said Christine Lalonde, an expert in Inuit art with the National Gallery of Canada. 'She had her own sense of design... She was already willing to let the pencil go, because she had the hand and the eye co-ordination to make the image she already had in her head.' The National Gallery owns several copies of The Enchanted Owl, including the original pencil sketch from 1960. That sketch reveals much, said Lalonde. 'It's a very simple drawing — pencil on pulp paper. But you can see even then how confident and sure her line was as she was making the curves of the fanning feathers.'

In 1963 she was the subject of a National Film Board documentary by producer John Feeney, Eskimo Artist: Kenojuak, about Kenojuak, then 35, and her family, as well as traditional Inuit life on Baffin Island. The film showed a stonecutter carving her design into a relief block in stone, cutting away all the non-printing surfaces; she would then apply ink to the carved stone, usually in two or more colours, and carefully make 50 "shadow" prints for sale. With the money she earned from the film, Johnniebo was able to purchase his own canoe and become an independent hunter to help provide for the family, which now included a new daughter, Aggeo, and an adopted son, Ashevak.

National Gallery of Canada art expert Christine Lalonde marvelled at her confident artistry: "When you see her, you realize she doesn't use an eraser. She just sits down and she starts to draw."

Ashevak created several pieces of work to commemorate the creation of Nunavut, the third Canadian Territory, including a piece commissioned by the Department of Indian and Northern Affairs, Nunavut Qajanatuk (Our Beautiful Land) for the signing of the Inuit Land Claim Agreement in Principle in April 1990; Nunavut, a large hand-coloured lithograph to commemorate the signing of the Final Agreement early in 1994; a large diptych titled Siilavut, Nunavut (Our Environment, Our Land) in April 1999, when the Territory officially came into being.

The work of Ashevak Kenojuak can be found in the collections of Canada's National Gallery, the Art Gallery of Ontario, and the Burnaby Art Gallery.

Kenojuak became the first Inuit artist inducted into Canada's Walk of Fame in 2001, and traveled to Toronto with her daughter, Silaqi, to attend the ceremony.

Up until her death, Kenojuak contributed annually to the Cape Dorset Annual Print Release and continued to create new works. She was one of the last living artists from the West Baffin Eskimo Cooperative.

A CBC report of Kenojuak's death characterized her as a person of unfeigned humility and simplicity:
 Okpik Pitseolak, an artist from Cape Dorset who knew her personally, said Kenojuak Ashevak brought Inuit art to the world but was "very humble about her work." Pitseolak said that when she appeared on the radio to talk about her art, she didn't want to come across "as someone who brags" about it. But she was "thankful for the fact that she was given this gift." — CBC News
Since her death, prices for Kenojuak's work have reached new records, including $59,000CAD paid for a copy of Rabbit Eating Seaweed.

Style 
Kenojuak described her work thus in 1980: "I just take these things out of my thoughts and out of my imagination, and I don't really give any weight to the idea of its being an image of something.... I am just concentrating on placing it down on paper in a way that is pleasing to my own eye, whether it has anything to do with subjective reality or not. And that is how I have always tried to make my images, and that is still how I do it, and I haven't really thought about it any other way than that. That is just my style, and is the way I started and the way I am today."

Stained glass

In 2004, Kenojuak designed a stained glass window for a chapel at Appleby College in Oakville, Ontario. The window, of an Arctic char along with an owl against a vibrantly blue background, is the first such window made by an Inuit artist; it was suggested by two Biblical stories in which Jesus feeds a large crowd of people with two fish and a few loaves of bread, which for Kenojuak thoroughly embodied the spirit of the Inuit community, where food is always shared. The window was dedicated by the Rt. Rev. Andrew Atagotaaluk, Bishop of the Arctic, on November 9, 2004, celebrating the 75th anniversary of John Bell Chapel.

Collections
Her work is included in the collection of the Art Museum The University of Toronto, St. Lawrence University, the National Gallery of Canada, the Metropolitan Museum of Art, the Brooklyn Museum and the Smithsonian's National Museum of the American Indian.

Honours

 In 1967, she was made an Officer of the Order of Canada and was promoted to Companion in 1982.
 In 1970, Canada Post placed her 1960 print Enchanted Owl on a stamp to commemorate the centennial of the Northwest Territories.
 In 1974, she was elected a member of the Royal Canadian Academy of Arts.
 In 1980, Canada Post used her 1961 print Return of the Sun on a seventeen-cent stamp as part of its Inuit postage stamp series.
 In 1982, she has appointed a Companion of the Order of Canada.
 In 1991, she received an honorary doctorate from Queen's University.
 In 1992, she was awarded an honorary doctorate from the University of Toronto.
 In 1993, Canada Post featured 1969 drawing The Owl on a stamp for its Masterpieces of Canadian Art series.
 In 1999, a famous piece of hers, the "Red Owl" was featured on the April issue of the 1999 Millennium quarter series. Her initials in Inuktitut  were on the left of the design, the first time the language had appeared on circulation coinage.
 In 2001, she was inducted into Canada's Walk of Fame.
 In 2004, she created the first-ever Inuit-designed stained glass window for the John Bell Chapel at Appleby College in Oakville, Ontario.
 In 2008, she received the renowned $25,000 Governor General's Award in Visual and Media Arts from the Canada Council of the Arts.
 In 2012, she was appointed a member of the Order of Nunavut.
 In 2017, the Bank of Canada unveiled a commemorative $10 banknote in honour of Canada's 150th birthday; Ashevak's print Owl's Bouquet is featured on the note.

In popular culture 
The search engine Google showed a special doodle on its Canadian home page on October 3, 2014, for Kenojuak Ashevak's 87th Birthday.

On October 19, 2016, a Heritage Minute was released by Historica Canada. For the first time ever, the Heritage Minute is also narrated in a language other than French or English, in this case Inuktitut. Her granddaughter narrates the Heritage Minute, as well as appearing in it with her family. It was premiered in Cape Dorset, Nunavut, where it was also filmed.

Films
 In 1963, she was featured in the National Film Board of Canada documentary Eskimo Artist: Kenojuak, directed by John Feeney, which was nominated for an Academy Award for Documentary Short Subject in 1964. (Note on title: Feeney had suggested using the term "Inuit" in place of "Eskimo," but in 1963 it had been rejected as an unfamiliar term to non-Inuit audiences)
 1992, archival and contemporary footage of Kenojuak was featured in Momentum, Canada's film for Expo '92.

See also
List of inductees of Canada's Walk of Fame
Notable Aboriginal people of Canada

References

External links

Kenojuak Ashevak's Artist Profile at the Centre for Contemporary Canadian Art
Image timeline view at the Centre for Contemporary Canadian Art
Some of Kenojuak's prints appear at a Canadian government website.
Kenojuak Ashevak's Artist Page at Feheley Fine Arts.
Artist profile ten short videos featuring Kenojuak Ashevak speaking in Inuktitut about her artworks (15 min. 10 sec. in total)
Brief Audioguide about Kenojuak Ashevak's life (1 min. 32 sec.)
 The Enchanted Owl video and essay in the Virtual Museum of Canada

1927 births
2013 deaths
Inuit from the Northwest Territories
Members of the Order of Nunavut
Members of the Royal Canadian Academy of Arts
Canadian stamp designers
Women stamp designers
Inuit printmakers
Inuit illustrators
Companions of the Order of Canada
People from Kinngait
Artists from Nunavut
20th-century Canadian women artists
Women printmakers
Governor General's Award in Visual and Media Arts winners
Indspire Awards
20th-century Canadian printmakers
Inuit from Nunavut
Women graphic designers
Deaths from lung cancer in Nunavut
Coin designers
Canadian textile artists